Ricardo Chacón (born 30 April 1963) is a retired Cuban sprinter. He represented his country at one outdoor and two indoor World Championships.

International competitions

Personal bests
Outdoor
100 metres – 10.21 (+0.3 m/s, Havana 1987)
200 metres – 20.86 (+1.9 m/s, Sofia 1989)
Indoor
60 metres – 6.57 (Oviedo 1989)

References

All-Athletics profile

1964 births
Living people
Cuban male sprinters
Athletes (track and field) at the 1987 Pan American Games
World Athletics Championships athletes for Cuba
Pan American Games silver medalists for Cuba
Pan American Games medalists in athletics (track and field)
Universiade medalists in athletics (track and field)
Universiade gold medalists for Cuba
Medalists at the 1987 Pan American Games
20th-century Cuban people